Hands Off! is a 1921 American silent Western film directed by George Marshall and starring Tom Mix, Pauline Curley and  Charles K. French.

Cast
 Tom Mix as Tex Roberts
 Pauline Curley as Ramona Wadley
 Charles K. French as Clint Wadley
 Lloyd Bacon as Ford Wadley
 Frank Clark as Capt. Jim Ellison
 Sid Jordan as Pete Dinsmore
 Merrill McCormick as Tony Alviro 
 Virginia Warwick as Bonita
 Jack Dill as The Terrible Swede
 Marvin Loback as Jumbo

References

Bibliography
 Connelly, Robert B. The Silents: Silent Feature Films, 1910-36, Volume 40, Issue 2. December Press, 1998.
 Munden, Kenneth White. The American Film Institute Catalog of Motion Pictures Produced in the United States, Part 1. University of California Press, 1997.
 Solomon, Aubrey. The Fox Film Corporation, 1915-1935: A History and Filmography. McFarland, 2011.

External links
 

1921 films
1921 Western (genre) films
American silent feature films
Silent American Western (genre) films
American black-and-white films
1920s English-language films
Fox Film films
Films directed by George Marshall
1920s American films